Phyllis Milgroom Ryan (July 2, 1927 - May 5, 1998) was a civil rights activist from Brookline, Massachusetts. Most of her work was concentrated in fair housing, welfare reform, and prison reform during the 1960s through the 1970s.

Personal life
Phyllis Milgroom Ryan was born on July 2, 1927 in Chelsea, Massachusetts to Arthur and Elizabeth Milgroom, who were both Russian immigrants. She grew up in Brookline, Massachusetts and attended Brookline High School. Ryan enrolled in Northeastern University, where she found her start in political activism with the student organization Students for Henry Wallace. Ryan graduated in 1950 with a degree in English. In 1951, she married William Ryan (psychologist), with whom she often collaborated to organize protests. The couple had their only child, daughter Elizabeth Ryan Yuengert, in 1954. Phyllis was successful in the media relations positions she held with various political organizations and also helped those organizations with the planning and coordination of their political demonstrations. Among her most famous contributions in social activism were those to the prison reform and fair housing movements. Phyllis remained politically active throughout the rest of her life, including her last campaign, which made a public lake in Newton, Massachusetts handicap accessible after she developed multiple sclerosis. She died on May 5, 1998 as a result of her medical condition.

Social activism

Boston Public School stayout
A series of boycotts against the Boston Public Schools, called Stayout for Freedom, were organized starting in 1963 to protest segregation of the Boston Public School System. The Stayouts began as a way to demonstrate how empty certain public schools in Boston would be if all of the non-white students did not show up. Instead of going to school, the students went to Freedom Schools, where they learned about history of blacks in America, civics, and civil disobedience as protest. Phyllis Ryan, her husband William, and other fair housing activists in the suburbs of Boston organized their own Stayout, because housing practices played a major role in the segregation of schools. Instead of non-white students in Boston boycotting their schools, students from Boston's predominantly white suburban schools followed the example of earlier Stayouts and were bussed into Roxbury to participate in Freedom Schools. Phyllis oversaw the public relations of the event and managed to get the event on the front page of major Boston newspapers.

"Dump the Duke" campaign
Ryan, her husband William, and Hubie Jones, another social activist in Boston, created the 'Should Dukakis Be Governor?' Committee in 1976 to organize the 'Dump the Duke' movement. The committee sought to raise awareness of and opposition to Massachusetts Governor Michael Dukakis's cuts to welfare funding in 1975. Their campaign sought to expose what they saw as contradictions between Dukakis's campaign promises and his actions in office in an effort to undermine his political authority and re-election.

Fair housing
The mission of the Fair Housing Federation of Greater Boston was to eliminate housing discrimination in Boston's predominantly white suburbs. Ryan led the campaign in Brookline, Massachusetts, where she urged other Brookline residents to sign a "Good Neighbor" statement as a declaration that race would not factor in a decision to sell their house. 80% of the residents who signed the statement also added stickers to the doors of their homes.

Prison reform
Ryan, as part of the Ad Hoc Committee on Prison Reform, worked to improve conditions of prisons, with efforts particularly focused in the Walpole State Prison in Walpole, Massachusetts. Ryan and the Committee started a civilian observation program that brought civilians into the prisons to witness prison conditions first-hand. She also worked closely with inmates to advocate and help them advocate for their rights, especially when it came to prison guard brutality.

Welfare reform
In 1972, the Senate Finance Committee amended a welfare reform bill that passed through the United States House of Representatives and added a clause that would require welfare recipients to work on Federal projects in order to continue to receive Federal aid. Ryan, a member of the Committee Against Bogus Welfare Reform, spoke out against the bill for requiring work with no guaranteed minimum wage from those who are already in need. She also argued that single mothers on this welfare plan would have to then find daycare for their children. The amendment ended up being rescinded from the bill.

Organizations of affiliation 
 Ad Hoc Committee on Prison Reform
 Committee Against Bogus Welfare Reform
 Congress of Racial Equality (CORE)
 Fair Housing Federation
 Massachusetts Freedom Movement
 Southern Christian Leadership Conference (SCLC)

References

Notes

1927 births
1998 deaths
American civil rights activists
People from Chelsea, Massachusetts
Place of death missing
Brookline High School alumni
Northeastern University alumni